Mnesistega is a genus of moth in the family Gelechiidae.

Species
 Mnesistega convexa Meyrick, 1923
 Mnesistega talantodes Meyrick, 1918

References

Gelechiinae